The 1976 Cologne Cup, was a men's tennis tournament played on indoor carpet courts in Cologne, West Germany that was part of the 1976 Commercial Union Assurance Grand Prix circuit and categorized as a One Star event. It was the inaugural edition of the tournament and was held from 1 November through 6 November 1976. First-seeded Jimmy Connors won the singles title and the accompanying $10,000 first-prize money

Finals

Singles
 Jimmy Connors defeated  Frew McMillan 6–2, 6–3
 It was Connors' 11th singles title of the year and the 52nd of his career.

Doubles
 Bob Hewitt /  Frew McMillan defeated  Colin Dowdeswell /  Mike Estep 6–1, 3–6, 7–6

References

External links
 ITF tournament edition details

Cologne Cup
Cologne Cup